Agelena canariensis is a species of spider in the family Agelenidae, which contains at least 1,350 species . It was first described by Lucas in 1838. It is native to the Canary Islands, Algeria and Morocco.

References

canariensis
Spiders of Africa
Spiders described in 1838